Reddish is an unincorporated community in Jersey County, Illinois, United States. It is located along Illinois Route 16 and Illinois Route 100, about two miles east of the Illinois River.

References

Unincorporated communities in Illinois
Unincorporated communities in Jersey County, Illinois